Rahuri Assembly constituency is one of the 288 Vidhan Sabha (legislative assembly) constituencies of Maharashtra state, western India. This constituency is located in Ahmednagar district.

Geographical scope
The constituency comprises Rahuri and Vambori revenue circles and Rahuri Municipal Council belonging to Rahuri taluka, Jeur revenue circle belonging to Ahmednagar taluka and Karanji revenue circle belonging to Pathardi taluka.

Representatives
 2014: Shivaji Bhanudas Kardile, Bharatiya Janata Party.
2019: Prajakt Tanpure, Nationalist Congress Party

Results

Assembly elections 2019

References

Assembly constituencies of Maharashtra
Ahmednagar district